Podhoroď is a village and municipality in the Sobrance District in the Košice Region of east Slovakia.

History
In historical records the village was first mentioned in 1406.

Geography
The village lies at an altitude of 339 metres and covers an area of 16.609 km2.
It has a population of about 400 people.

Facilities
The village has a public library, a gym and a football pitch, as well as a pharmacy and a doctor's surgery.

The village also has its own birth registry office.

External links
http://www.statistics.sk/mosmis/eng/run.html
http://en.e-obce.sk/obec/podhorod/podhorod.html
http://www.podhorod.sk

Villages and municipalities in Sobrance District